University Physics is the name of a two-volume physics textbook written by Hugh Young and Roger Freedman. The first edition of University Physics was published by Mark Zemansky and Francis Sears in 1949. Hugh Young became a coauthor with Sears and Zemansky in 1973. Now in its 15th edition, University Physics is among the most widely used introductory textbooks in the world.

University Physics by Pearson is not to be confused with a free textbook by the same name, available from OpenStax.

Contents

Volume 1. Classic mechanics, Waves/acoustics, and Thermodynamics

Mechanics
 Units, Physical Quantities, and Vectors
 Motion Along a Straight Line
 Motion in Two or Three Dimensions
 Newton's Laws of Motion
 Applying Newton’s Laws
 Work and Kinetic Energy
 Potential Energy and Energy Conservation
 Momentum, Impulse, and Collisions
 Rotation of Rigid Bodies
 Dynamics of Rotational Motion
 Equilibrium and Elasticity
 Fluid Mechanics
 Gravitation
 Periodic Motion
Waves/Acoustics
 Mechanical Waves
 Sound and Hearing 
Thermodynamics
 Temperature and Heat
 Thermal Properties of Matter 
 The First Law of Thermodynamics 
 The Second Law of Thermodynamics

Volume 2. Electromagnetism, optics, and modern physics

Electromagnetism
 Electric Charge and Electric Field 
 Gauss’s Law
 Electric Potential
 Capacitance and Dielectrics
 Current, Resistance, and Electromotive Force
 Direct-Current Circuits 
 Magnetic Field and Magnetic Forces
 Sources of Magnetic Field
 Electromagnetic Induction
 Inductance
 Alternating Current
 Electromagnetic Waves

Optics
 The Nature and Propagation of Light 
 Geometric Optics 
 Interference
 Diffraction
Modern Physics
 Relativity 
 Photons: Light Waves Behaving as Particles 
 Particles Behaving as Waves 
 Quantum Mechanics
 Atomic Structure
 Molecules and Condensed Matter
 Nuclear Physics 
 Particle Physics and Cosmology

References 

Physics textbooks